Bonsignori (or Buonsignori) was an Italian noble family whose notable members included:
Orlando Bonsignori (d. 1273), banker
Francesco Bonsignori (1455-1519), painter

See also
Gran Tavola, the Bonsignori bank